Bafing may refer to:

 Bafing River, which runs through Guinea and Mali
 Bafing Region, region in Ivory Coast
 Bafing National Park, in Mali